Following is a list of senators of Haute-Corse, people who have represented the department of Haute-Corse in the Senate of France.
The department was formed on 15 September 1975, when the department of Corsica was divided into Haute-Corse and Corse-du-Sud.

Fifth Republic 
Senators for Haute-Corse under the French Fifth Republic:

References

Sources

 
Haute-Corse-related lists
Lists of members of the Senate (France) by department